The Benjamin Franklin Bridge, originally named the Delaware River Bridge and known locally as the Ben Franklin Bridge, is a suspension bridge across the Delaware River connecting Philadelphia, Pennsylvania, and Camden, New Jersey. Owned and operated by the Delaware River Port Authority, it is one of four primary vehicular bridges between Philadelphia and southern New Jersey, along with the Betsy Ross, Walt Whitman, and Tacony-Palmyra bridges. It carries Interstate 676/U.S. Route 30, pedestrians/cyclists, and the PATCO Speedline.

The bridge was dedicated as part of the 1926 Sesquicentennial Exposition, celebrating the 150th anniversary of the signing of the United States Declaration of Independence. From 1926 to 1929, it had the longest single span of any suspension bridge in the world.

History
Plans for a bridge to augment the ferries across the Delaware River began as early as 1818, when one plan envisioned using Smith Island, a narrow island off the Philadelphia shore that was removed in 1893. Local engineer John C. Trautwine proposed a four-span suspension bridge in 1851. Then, in 1868, a committee of Philadelphia and Camden interests proposed a unique design with two parallel low-level drawbridge spans which would allow ships to pass in stages without interrupting traffic across the bridge. A later proposal by John Alexander Low Waddell employed helical approaches to avoid purchasing expensive land for approaches to a high-level suspension bridge. None of these proposals were constructed. To find a permanent solution, the Delaware River Bridge Joint Commission (now the Delaware River Port Authority) was created in 1919.

The chief engineer of the bridge was Polish-born Ralph Modjeski, the design engineer was Leon Moisseiff, the supervising architect was Paul Philippe Cret, and the construction engineer was Montgomery B. Case. Work began on January 6, 1922. At the peak of construction, 1,300 people worked on the bridge, and 15 died during its construction. The bridge was originally painted by a commercial painting company owned by David A. Salkind, of Philadelphia, which also painted the Golden Gate Bridge.  The bridge opened to traffic on July 1, 1926, three days ahead of its scheduled opening on the nation's 150th anniversary. At completion, its 1,750-foot (533-meter) span was the world's longest for a suspension bridge, a distinction it held until the opening of the Ambassador Bridge in 1929.

The name was changed to "Benjamin Franklin Bridge" in 1955, as a second Delaware River suspension bridge connecting Philadelphia and New Jersey was under construction (Walt Whitman Bridge).

The bridge was closed to vehicles on July 1, 2001, to allow pedestrians to celebrate its 75th anniversary.

Uses

Rail
The bridge originally included six vehicle lanes and two streetcar tracks on the main deck, with provision for a rapid transit track in each direction outboard of the deck's stiffening trusses, which rise above the deck rather than lie beneath it. The tracks were built to the nonstandard broad gauge of the Public Service Corporation of New Jersey's Camden streetcar system; the design called for the streetcars to cross the bridge from Camden to Philadelphia, enter an underground terminal beneath the bridge's west entrance plaza, and return to Camden via the opposite track. Streetcar stations were also built in the bridge's anchorages. None of the streetcar facilities were ever placed in service, as Public Service ran no cars across the bridge from its opening until the company abandoned its Camden streetcar system in 1932; after that, the tracks were removed, and the space was converted to vehicular lanes.

The outer pair of rapid transit tracks went into service in 1936 with the opening of the Bridge Line subway connecting Broadway and City Hall in Camden with 8th and Market Streets in Philadelphia. The Bridge Line, extended to 16th and Locust in 1952, began carrying PATCO trains in 1969. Today, it carries the PATCO Speedline, which descends into tunnels on both sides of the bridge. Both, the Eastbound and Westbound railroad tracks and support structure were reconstructed from June 2014 and finished October 2014.

Roads
The bridge carries highways I-676 and US 30, but only the New Jersey section of the bridge carries I-676, as the section of the bridge approaches on the Pennsylvania side are not up to interstate highway standards, including at-grade traffic crossings.  The Pennsylvania section of I-676 (which runs east–west, and not north–south as New Jersey's I-676 does) ends at the ramps to I-95.  I-676 is signed across the bridge from both sides, however, to be less confusing to drivers. Before the 1953 New Jersey state highway renumbering, New Jersey Route 25 (Route 25), Route 43, and Route 45 ended in the middle of the bridge, and I-76 was signed on the bridge until 1972, when it switched routings with I-676, which until then ran across the Walt Whitman Bridge.

"Zipper" barrier
The seven vehicular lanes are divided by a concrete "zipper" barrier, which can be mechanically moved to configure the lanes for traffic volume or construction. Red and green signals mounted on overhead gantries indicate which lanes are open or closed to traffic in each direction. The lights indicate closures for construction, accidents or breakdown as well as traffic separation. Generally, during the morning rush hour, there are four lanes open westbound and three eastbound, with the situation reversed during the evening rush hour.  Before the zipper barrier was installed in 2000-2001, one lane of the bridge was kept closed at peak times to reduce the risk of head-on collisions as there was no physical barrier separating east and westbound traffic.

Tolls
Effective July 2011, one-way tolls to cross the bridge are charged in the westbound (towards Pennsylvania) direction. The charges include:
 A $5.00 toll is charged to westbound passenger vehicles (less than  gross vehicle weight).
 Trucks, commercial vehicles, mobile homes, and recreation vehicles (weighing at least . gross vehicle weight), pay $7.50 per axle.
 Seniors aged 65 and older can use a discount program integrated with E-ZPass to pay $2.50 per trip.

Proposed Camden-Philadelphia BRT
There are proposals for a Camden-Philadelphia BRT, a bus rapid transit system between the two cities extending into Camden and Gloucester that would use the bridge.

Walkways
Pedestrian walkways run along both sides of the bridge, elevated over and separated from the vehicular lanes; of these, only one is open at a time.  The DRPA temporarily closed the walkways to the public the day after the 7 July 2005 London bombings, citing security concerns. The DRPA also closes the walkway after snowfall, or if the weather forecast includes a chance of snowfall, and closed it in late August 2011 during Hurricane Irene and in late October 2012 during Hurricane Sandy.

See also
 
 
 
 
 
 List of crossings of the Delaware River

References

External links

Benjamin Franklin Bridge, Historical overview, by Steve Anderson.

Delaware River Port Authority Official Website
PATCO Official Website
Slideshow
Speedliner Newspaper Website

Delaware River Port Authority
Bridges on the Interstate Highway System
Suspension bridges in New Jersey
Suspension bridges in Pennsylvania
Culture of Philadelphia
Toll bridges in New Jersey
Toll bridges in Pennsylvania
Interstate 76 (Ohio–New Jersey)
Bridges completed in 1926
Bridges in Philadelphia
Transportation in Camden, New Jersey
Bridges over the Delaware River
Tolled sections of Interstate Highways
U.S. Route 30
Paul Philippe Cret buildings
Road-rail bridges in the United States
Road bridges in New Jersey
Railroad bridges in New Jersey
Road bridges in Pennsylvania
Railroad bridges in Pennsylvania
Bridges in Camden County, New Jersey
Philadelphia Register of Historic Places
1926 establishments in the United States
Center City, Philadelphia
Rapid transit bridges
Bridges of the United States Numbered Highway System
Steel bridges in the United States
Interstate vehicle bridges in the United States